Nataša Jovanović (born April 14, 1966) is a politician in Serbia. She has served several terms in the National Assembly of Serbia as a member of the far-right Serbian Radical Party.

Early life and career
Jovanović was born in Kragujevac, then part of the Socialist Republic of Serbia in the Socialist Federal Republic of Yugoslavia. She was employed with the Zastava Impeks company from 1987 to 1989 and was a tour guide with the agencies Holidej and Kontiki from 1991 to 1996.

Political career
Jovanović joined the Serbian Radical Party in 1992. She was one of the party's candidates for the Kragujevac division in the 1993 Serbian parliamentary election, receiving the twenty-fourth position out of twenty-nine on the party's electoral list. The Radicals won five seats in the division, and she was not subsequently included in the party's parliamentary delegation. (From 1992 to 2000, Serbia's electoral law stipulated that one-third of parliamentary mandates would be assigned to candidates from successful lists in numerical order, while the remaining two-thirds would be distributed amongst other candidates on the lists by the sponsoring parties. Jovanović could have been included in the Radical Party's delegation notwithstanding her low position on the list, although in the event she was not.)

Yugoslav parliamentarian
Jovanović was elected to the Assembly of the Federal Republic of Yugoslavia's Chamber of Citizens in the 1996 election. The Radical Party won sixteen seats and initially served in opposition to a governing alliance led by the Socialist Party of Serbia and its Montenegrin allies. In 1998, the Radical Party joined a coalition government in Serbia led by the Socialist Party; the following year, the party also became part of the government at the federal level in Yugoslavia.

In December 1998, Jovanoviċ was one of nineteen Serbian politicians denied entry to European Union countries for what was described as her role in bringing about a restrictive Law on Public Information, which critics regarded as an attempt to suppress the activities of opposition journalists. A news report from this time described her as chair of the Radical Party's organization in Šumadija.

Jovanović sought re-election to the Chamber of Citizens in the 2000 Yugoslav election. She was defeated when the Radical Party failed to win any mandates in Kragujevac.

Member of the National Assembly of Serbia
Serbia's electoral system was reformed in 2000, such that the entire country became a single electoral division. Jovanović received the fourteenth position on the Radical Party's list for the 2000 Serbian parliamentary election; the party won twenty-three mandates, and she was included in its delegation to the assembly. (From 2000 to 2011, Serbian parliamentary mandates were awarded to sponsoring parties or coalitions rather than to individual candidates, and it was common practice for parties to distribute the mandates out of numerical order. Although Jovanović did not automatically receive a seat in parliament by virtue of her position on the list, she was included in the party's delegation all the same.) The election was won by the Democratic Opposition of Serbia; the Radicals served in opposition, often using obstructionist parliamentary tactics. In April 2001, the legislature was adjourned when Jovanović refused to leave the floor after exceeding her allotted time to speak. On another occasion, Jovanović splashed water on speaker Nataša Mićić during a contentious debate. She took part in a rally at the legislature in October 2003, saying that the Radical Party would seek to bring down the "criminal" government as soon as possible.

The Radical Party emerged as the largest party in the assembly after the 2003 elections, although it did not command a majority and did not form government. Jovanović received the twelfth position on the party's list and was once again included in its parliamentary delegation. At a 2006 rally, she described Ratko Mladić, at the time a fugitive and accused Serbian war criminal, as "the pride of the Serbian nation, unlike those in power."

In June 2006, Jovanović was appointed as a substitute member of Serbia's delegation to the Parliamentary Assembly of the Council of Europe. On one occasion, she took part in a delegation seeking an international investigation into human organ trafficking in Kosovo and Metohija.

Jovanović received the thirty-second position on the Radical Party's list in the 2007 parliamentary election and was again included in its delegation after the election. The Radicals again won the largest number of seats but, as before, did not command a majority. Jovanović led the Radical Party's negotiating team in talks with Serbian president Boris Tadić on the formation of a new government; she argued that a member of the Radical Party should be nominated for prime minister and that Tadić should resign as president due to what was described as a poor showing by his Democratic Party. This advice was predictably not taken, and the Radicals remained in opposition. In May 2007, however, a temporary alliance between the Radicals, the Socialist Party of Serbia, and the Democratic Party of Serbia (not to be confused with Tadić's party) resulted in Jovanović being selected as a deputy speaker of the assembly.

A new parliamentary election was held in 2008, with inconclusive results. Jovanović, again included in her party's parliamentary group, took part negotiations between the Radicals, the Socialists, and the Democratic Party of Serbia toward forming a new government with Vojislav Koštunica as prime minister. The Socialists ultimately declined to participate in the deal, instead forming an alliance with Tadić's For a European Serbia alliance. Notwithstanding this, Jovanović was again selected as a deputy speaker in June 2008.

When the Tadić government arrested and extradited former Bosnian Serb leader Radovan Karadžić on war crimes charges in 2008, Jovanović was reported to have said of Tadić in a parliamentary debate, “Let the sun never shine upon him, let his name be deleted, let God punish him. He is the biggest traitor.” On another occasion, she defended Radical Party leader Vojislav Šešelj's statement that the killer of Zoran Đinđić should be recognized as a hero of the Serb people on par with Gavrilo Princip.

The Radical Party experienced a significant split in late 2008, and several leading figures formed the breakaway Serbian Progressive Party, a more moderate conservative grouping under the leadership of Tomislav Nikolić and Aleksandar Vučić. Jovanović remained with the Radicals and was considered a prominent ally of hardline party leader Vojislav Šešelj.

Serbia's electoral system was reformed again in 2011, such that parliamentary mandates were awarded in numerical order to candidates on successful lists. Jovanović received the twelfth position on the party's electoral list; the party failed to cross the electoral threshold to win representation in the assembly. She was again included on the Radical list for the 2014 election, in which the party once again failed to win representation.

The Radicals returned to parliament with the 2016 election, winning twenty-two mandates. Jovanović, who received the ninth position on the list, was re-elected and represented the party along with Nemanja Šarović in talks with president Tomislav Nikolić prior to the formation of a new government. The results of the talks were a foregone conclusion; the Progressives and their allies commanded a majority of seats in parliament. The Radical delegation used their consultation session to demand that Nikolić resign, and the meeting was reported to have ended after thirty seconds.

Jovanović is currently a member of the parliamentary foreign affairs committee and the committee on the right of the child, a deputy member of the defense and internal affairs committee, a member of Serbia's delegation to the NATO Parliamentary Assembly (where Serbia has associate status), and a member of the parliamentary friendship groups with Russia and China.

References

1966 births
Living people
Members of the National Assembly (Serbia)
Members of the Chamber of Citizens (Federal Republic of Yugoslavia)
Substitute Members of the Parliamentary Assembly of the Council of Europe
Members of the NATO Parliamentary Assembly
Politicians from Kragujevac
Serbian Radical Party politicians